In 805 Charlemagne issued a fourth ban on the export of weapons to the Slavs. According to Moissac Chronicle Charlemagne's son Charles laid siege to "Canburg" (somewhere on the Elbe in Bohemia). Nobody knows where exactly Canburg was situated. The chronicle writes about the left bank of the Elbe river, but the author could easily muddle it up with other rivers in the area (e.g. Vltava - Moldau, Ohře - Eger River). Lingual similarity is the cause of a hypothesis that Canburg was situated somewhere nearby the present-day town of Kadaň. Some historians mention as a possible site a fortified settlement in Divoká Šárka.

References

 Chronicon Moissacense a.a. 805, MGH SS 
 Annales Mettenses priores, a.a. 805, MGH SS 
Charlemagne
Geography of the Czech Republic
Military history of the Carolingian Empire
Canburg